The Pasión River is a river located in the northern lowlands region of Guatemala. The river is fed by a number of upstream tributaries whose sources lie in the hills of Alta Verapaz. At this confluence the greater Usumacinta River is formed, which runs northward to its eventual outlet in the Gulf of Mexico. The Pasión River's principal tributaries are the San Juan River, the Machaquila River, and the Cancuén River.

The Pasión river basin is recognized as an archaeological region or zone, and contains a number of archaeological sites of the pre-Columbian Maya civilization, which to an extent shared some commonalities in Maya architectural style, political history and glyphic conventions. Maya ceremonial and urban centers located within the region include Dos Pilas, Tamarindito, Altar de Sacrificios, Aguateca, Seibal and Machaquila.

Pollution
On June 6, 2015, residents around La Pasión River reported finding of a high count of dead fish floating along the river. On June 11, 2015, Guatemala's authorities inspected palm oil company "Reforestadora de Palmas de Petén, S.A." (REPSA), located in Sayaxché, and found traces of Malathion in the company's tributaries leading to La Pasión River. Tranquilino Xojalaj, administrator of REPSA, declared that heavy rain caused the treatment wells to flood into the river, however the company denied responsibility, stating that they do not use Malathion as a pesticide.

The pollution might have entered the Usumacinta River, which travels all the way to México.

See also 

 Petexbatún

Notes and references

References

Bibliography 

 

Rivers of Guatemala
Geography of Mesoamerica
Geography of the Petén Department
Usumacinta River